The Women's 100 metres at the 2011 All-Africa Games took place on 11–12 September at the Estádio Nacional do Zimpeto.

The final held at 6:55 p.m. local time.

Medalists

Records
Prior to the competition, the records were as follows:

The Games record was broken by the gold medalist.

Schedule

Results

Heats
Qualification: First 3 in each heat (Q) and the next 2 fastest (q) advance to the final.

Wind:Heat 1: -1.1 m/s, Heat 2: +0.5 m/s, Heat 3: +1.4 m/s

Final
Wind: +2.5 m/s

References

External links
100 metres results at AfricaAthle.com

100 meters women
2011 in women's athletics
2011